Seo Eun-kwang (born November 22, 1990), is a South Korean singer, songwriter, entertainer, musical actor, and a member of the K-pop boy band BtoB, currently signed to Cube Entertainment.

Television series

Television shows

Web shows

Musicals

Hosting

References 

Seo Eun-kwang